The 1975 National Commissioners Invitational Tournament was a single-elimination tournament of 8 National Collegiate Athletic Association (NCAA) Division I teams that did not participate in the 1975 NCAA Men's Division I Basketball Tournament or 1975 National Invitation Tournament. Drake defeated Southern California, Bowling Green and Arizona in that order to win the championship. Bob Elliot of Arizona was named tournament MVP.

Brackets

National Commissioners
National Commissioners